The Invicta Mustangs are an ice hockey team in Gillingham in Kent England. They compete in the South 2 (Wilkinson) division of the National Ice Hockey League.
 
The Mustangs are a senior team, with players signed to seasonal contracts.

Club roster 2022–23

Statistical records

Top ten Appearances
League, Cup & Play Offs; as at end of 2021/22 Season 
Players in bold are still active with the club.

Top ten Points Scorers
League, Cup & Play Offs; as at end of 2021/22 Season 
Players in bold are still active with the club.

Top ten Goal Scorers
League, Cup & Play Offs; as at end of 2021/22 Season 
Players in bold are still active with the club.

Top ten Assists 
League, Cup & Play Offs; as at end of 2021/22 Season 
Players in bold are still active with the club.

Top ten Penalty Minutes 
League, Cup & Play Offs; as at end of 2021/22 Season 
Players in bold are still active with the club.

Top ten Points Per Game 
League, Cup & Play Offs; as at end of 2021/22 Season (Players with under 20 appearances not included) 
Players in bold are still active with the club.

Season-by-season record

Retired Numbers
7 - In honour of Danny Terry

Other ice hockey teams based in Gillingham
 Invicta Dynamics (Ladies senior team)
 Invicta Dynamos (Mens senior team)
 Invicta Colts (Under 18's)
 Invicta Mavericks (Under 16's)
 Invicta Chargers (Under 14's)
 Invicta Stampede (Under 12's)
 Invicta Buckeroos (Under 10's)
 Invicta Knights (Recreational)
 Medway Madness (Recreational)
 Medway Eagles (Beginner Recreational)
 Medway Marauders (Recreational)

References

 
Sport in Medway
Ice hockey clubs established in 1997